The 1937–38 Boston Bruins season was the Bruins' 14th season in the NHL.

Offseason

Regular season

Final standings

Record vs. opponents

Schedule and results

Playoffs
The Boston Bruins lost the Semi-Finals to the Toronto Maple Leafs being swept three games to none.

Player statistics

Regular season
Scoring

Goaltending

Playoffs
Scoring

Goaltending

Awards and records

Transactions

See also
1937–38 NHL season

References

External links

Boston Bruins seasons
Boston
Boston
Boston Bruins
Boston Bruins
1930s in Boston